Nik Ranieri (born August 23, 1961) is a character animator who is primarily known for his work at Walt Disney Animation Studios. He has been supervising animator of many characters, and remained so until his layoff in 2013.

Career
After graduating from the Classical Animation Program at Sheridan College in Oakville, Ontario, Ranieri went to work for Atkinson Film-Arts animation production studio (in Ottawa, Ontario).

He began animating for Disney in 1987 on the London, England-based animation crew of Who Framed Roger Rabbit, working with director Richard Williams. Soon after that he moved to Disney's feature animation studio in Glendale, California, where he animated on The Little Mermaid (working primarily on the character of Ursula the sea witch, under directing animator Ruben Aquino). On his next film, Ranieri was promoted to supervising animator on the character of Wilbur in The Rescuers Down Under.

In 1995, he won an Annie Award in the category 'Individual Achievement in Character Animation' for his animation of the raccoon "Meeko" in Pocahontas.

In 1997, he won an Annie Award in the category 'Individual Achievement in Character Animation' for his animation of Hades in Hercules.

While Ranieri is regarded as one of the modern-day masters of hand-drawn character animation (especially excelling in subtle dialogue scenes and facial expressions) he also successfully made the switch to animating in CG on films such as Chicken Little, Meet the Robinsons and Bolt.
Ranieri returned to his roots in classic hand-drawn animation for the 2009 Disney animated film The Princess and the Frog.

On April 6, 2013, The Walt Disney Company announced that Ranieri, along with eight other animators working at Walt Disney Animation Studios, had been laid off in an effort for the company as a whole to cut costs.

He later worked at Studio Roqovan, where he worked on the video game World War Toons, up until the studio closed in 2019. Ranieri won the Outstanding Individual Achievement In Animation award in 2021 at the 73rd Primetime Creative Arts Emmy Awards as Lead Character Layout for The Simpsons episode Wad Goals.

Filmography

Awards 
 1995 Best Individual Achievement: Character Animation for 'Hades' in Hercules
 1997 Best Individual Achievement for Animation for 'Meeko' in Pocahontas
 1997 'NCS Division Award' in Feature Animation (for Hades) 
 2021 Outstanding Individual Achievement In Animation, 73rd Primetime Creative Arts Emmy Awards

References

External links 

American animators
Sheridan College animation program alumni
Living people
Walt Disney Animation Studios people
1961 births
Annie Award winners